UFC 47: It’s On was a mixed martial arts event held by the Ultimate Fighting Championship on April 2, 2004, at the Mandalay Bay Events Center in Las Vegas, Nevada. The event was broadcast live on pay-per-view, and later released on DVD.

History
Headlining the card was the long-awaited match between Chuck Liddell and Tito Ortiz.

The title "It's On!" refers to Chuck Liddell and Tito Ortiz's long-running negotiations leading up to the fight. Fans had been awaiting the fight for more than a year, and while both fighters had their own stories as to why it took so long, the fight finally took place in 2004. Ortiz claims that as friends and former training partners, he and Liddell had made a pact never to fight. Liddell claims there was no such pact, that he would fight anyone anytime, and accused Ortiz of ducking the fight.

A match-up between Tim Sylvia and Andrei Arlovski for the then-vacant UFC Heavyweight Championship was scheduled for the event, but Sylvia was pulled due to a recurrence of positive drug samples just a day before the event. Arlovski was re-booked on short notice in a non-title fight against Wesley Correira, who was pulled from a scheduled main card fight with Mike Kyle to replace Sylvia. Wes Sims stepped in on a day's notice to face Mike Kyle at this event as well. The Sylvia–Arlovski match-up was finally re-booked for the Interim Heavyweight Championship at UFC 51 in February 2005.

This was the first card to feature "On The Mat" with Marc Laimon, a brief instructional video demonstrating the triangle choke.

Results

Reported payout
The total fighter payroll for UFC 47 was $333,000.

Tito Ortiz: $125,000
Chuck Liddell: $100,000 (including $50,000 win bonus)
Andrei Arlovski: $23,000 (including $8,000 win bonus)
Genki Sudo: $16,000 (including $8,000 win bonus)
Wes "Cabbage" Correira: $12,000
Yves Edwards: $12,000 (including $6,000 win bonus)
Robbie Lawler: $8,000
Hermes Franca: $6,000
Nick Diaz: $6,000 (including $3,000 win bonus)
Mike Kyle: $6,000 (including $3,000 win bonus)
Wes Sims: $5,000
Chris Lytle: $4,000 (including $2,000 win bonus)
Jonathan Wiezorek: $4,000 (including $2,000 win bonus)
Mike Brown: $2,000
Tiki Ghosn: $2,000
Wade Shipp: $2,000

See also 
 Ultimate Fighting Championship
 List of UFC champions
 List of UFC events
 2004 in UFC

References

External links
Official UFC past events page

Ultimate Fighting Championship events
2004 in mixed martial arts
Mixed martial arts in Las Vegas
2004 in sports in Nevada